The Dairy Shorthorn is a British breed of dairy cattle. It derives from the Shorthorn cattle of Tees-side, in the North Riding of Yorkshire and in Northumbria (now divided between County Durham and Northumberland) in north-eastern England. The Shorthorn was for this reason at first known as the Durham or Teeswater.

Selective breeding for a dairy type began in the late eighteenth century. This is known as the Dairy Shorthorn in the United Kingdom, Ireland, Australia and South Africa, and as the Milking Shorthorn in Canada, New Zealand and the United States. The Illawarra Shorthorn  of Australia is largely descended from the Dairy Shorthorn.

Worldwide, the conservation status of the Dairy Shorthorn, the Illawarra Shorthorn and the Milking Shorthorn is "not at risk". In the United Kingdom the small remainder of the breed not affected by indiscriminate cross-breeding in the twentieth century is known as the Dairy Shorthorn (Original Population). It is critically endangered. Both it and the Northern Dairy Shorthorn are listed as "priority" – the highest category of risk – on the watchlist of the Rare Breeds Survival Trust.

In the nineteenth century the Durham – as it was then usually known – was very extensively used for cross-breeding in many countries of the world; it has contributed to the development of more than forty different breeds.

History 

Short-horned cattle of good quality are documented on the Yorkshire estates of the Dukes and Earls of Northumberland in the late sixteenth century. The first significant attempts at selective breeding of these cattle were made by Charles and Robert Colling in County Durham, who based their work on that of Robert Bakewell of Dishley, in Leicestershire. The principal work of selection for dairy qualities in the Durham/Shorthorn was done in the early nineteenth century by Thomas Bates of Kirklevington (now in Stockton-on-Tees, North Yorkshire), building principally on stock bought from the Colling brothers. A herd-book for all types of Shorthorn cattle – the Coates Herd Book – was begun by George Coates in 1822, and initially listed 850 cows and 710 bulls; it was later taken over by the breed society, the Shorthorn Society of Great Britain and Ireland, which was formed in 1874. Thomas Bates's herd was auctioned off piecemeal in 1850, which led to an expansion of interest in cattle of this type. Breed numbers reached a peak in 1949, after which increasing competition from the Friesian caused them to decline rapidly. The number of registered bulls, already much lower than before the war at about 35% of the national total in 1949, fell to little over 10% in 1960. Separate sections for beef and dairy strains within the Shorthorn breed were created in 1958.

In 1969 the breed society approved a programme of cross-breeding of the Dairy Shorthorn with a variety of other European breeds. Initially these were the Danish Red, the Meuse-Rhine-Yssel, the Red Friesian, the Red Holstein and the Simmental; later, introgression from Angeln, Ayrshire, Norwegian Red and Swedish Red-and-White was also permitted, as was the use of any bull that the Society had approved. Animals with no more than 25% Shorthorn heritage could be registered in the Dairy Shorthorn herd-book. The programme led to the development of a new composite breed, the Blended Red-and-White Shorthorn. It also led to the virtual extinction of the Dairy Shorthorn: by about 2009 there fewer than 100 breeding cows, and by 2012 there were no more than 50; in that year six purebred calves were added to the herd-book. The remnants of the breed were renamed to Dairy Shorthorn (Original Population) It is a critically endangered breed; both it and the Northern Dairy Shorthorn are listed as "priority" – the highest category of risk – on the watchlist of the Rare Breeds Survival Trust.

In other countries 

Shorthorns of both beef and dairy type were first exported to Maryland and Virginia in the United States in 1783. With further imports through the 1800s the breed spread across the whole country.

The first dairy cows imported into New Zealand were Shorthorns, when in 1814, they were shipped from New South Wales. Shorthorns were used as draught animals in bullock teams, were good milkers and provided good meat. Shorthorn herds were established by the early 1840s, and for a long time Shorthorns were New Zealand's most popular cattle breed.

The breed has served as part of the foundation for other red dairy breeds, including Swedish Red cattle, Angeln cattle and Illawarra cattle in Australia (with some Ayrshire ancestry).  The Ayrshire cattle breed was originally formed from dairy-type Shorthorn cattle in Scotland.

The Milking/Dairy Shorthorn breed has seen population growth in several countries in the past decade after many years of population decline.  The Canadian Milking Shorthorn Society had their highest registration and membership totals in over 25 years in 2012.  All major populations have seen an increase in interest in Milking Shorthorns by dairy producers, artificial insemination organisations, and crossbreeders.

Characteristics 

They are red, red with white markings, white, or roan. Red and white coat colour genes in purebred Milking Shorthorns are co-dominant, resulting in the roan coloration and unique colour patterns seen in the breed.

Milking/Dairy Shorthorn cattle are also known for high levels of fertility, grazing efficiency, and ease of management that result in the breed being highly suitable for low-input dairy operations in various production environments.  Milking Shorthorns are known for their durability, longevity, and ease of calving as well as their versatility in a number of production environments.

Original strains 
There are small groups of Milking/Dairy Shorthorns that have not been affected by cross-breeding and so remain true to the conformation and production levels of Shorthorns from the early twentieth century. These include the Dairy Shorthorn population in Australia, the Native Milking Shorthorns of the United States and the Dairy Shorthorn (Original Population) in the United Kingdom. In some countries, these animals may be known as Dual Purpose Shorthorns.

Notes

References

External links
American Milking Shorthorn Society
Canadian Milking Shorthorn Society
NZ Milking Shorthorn Association

Dairy cattle breeds
Cattle breeds originating in England
England
Cattle breeds